Yongxin County is a county in the west of Jiangxi province, People's Republic of China, bordering Hunan province to the west. It is located within the Jinggang Mountains under the jurisdiction of the prefecture-level city of Ji'an. The county was built in the ninth year of Jian'an in the Eastern Han Dynasty that is, in 204 AD. The name of the county was taken from Great Learning, which means "the sun (日) is forever (永) and the moon (月) is new (新)".

One of the villages in Yongxin, Sanwan Town, is known for the creation of the 1st regiment of the Chinese Red Army led by Mao Zedong with 1,000 soldiers that fled the Kuomintang after the failed Autumn Harvest Uprising in 1927.

Demographics 
At the end of 2021, the "Hukou" population (Chinese: 户籍人口) of Yongxin County was 523,683, a decrease of 1,478 from the end of the previous year. According to the data of the Seventh National Population Census in 2020, the total resident population (Chinese: 常住人口) of the county was 393,984 (excluding active-duty soldiers of the People's Liberation Army, residents of Hong Kong, Macao and Taiwan and foreigners living in the district). Compared with the 475,580 people in the Sixth National Population Census, a total of 81,596 people has decreased in ten years, a decrease of 17.16%. In 2021, the birth rate of Yongxin County was 5.47‰, the death rate was 0.55‰, and the natural growth rate was 4.92‰

Geography

Overview 
The landforms of the whole territory are dominated by mountains and hills. The terrain is high in the north and south and low in the middle, and slopes from the north and south sides to the middle. The highest peak in the whole territory is Qiushan Mountain, which is 1391 meters above sea level. The county's forest coverage rate is 70.8%.

Hydrology 
The streams all merge into Heshui River (a tributary of the Gan River).

Climate 
The climate of the district is Humid subtropical climate, with long hot summers and mild winters. The annual average temperature is 18.2 ℃, the annual average sunshine is 1756.9 hours, the annual average frost-free period is 283 days, and the annual average rainfall is 1530.7 mm.

Administrative divisions 
At present Yongxin County has 1 subdistrict ,10 towns and 13 townships. The seat of the county locates at the Hechuan Town (​禾川镇).

1 subdistrict 

 Sanyueping（三月坪街道）

10 towns

13 townships

References

External links
  Government site - 

 
County-level divisions of Jiangxi